Kolybelka is a rural locality (a selo) and the administrative center of Kolybelskoye Rural Settlement, Liskinsky District, Voronezh Oblast, Russia. The population was 1,309 as of 2010. There are 9 streets.

Geography 
Kolybelka is located 42 km southeast of Liski (the district's administrative centre) by road. Petropavlovka is the nearest rural locality.

References 

Rural localities in Liskinsky District